The Oaks is a historic home located at Christiansburg, Montgomery County, Virginia.  It was built in 1893, and is a two-story, asymmetrical Queen Anne style frame house.  It features a wraparound porch, a polygonal tower, a polygonal turret, and a hipped roof with two cross gables and four brick chimneys.  It is operated as a bed and breakfast.

It was listed on the National Register of Historic Places in 1994.

References

External links
The Oaks Bed and Breakfast website

Bed and breakfasts in Virginia
Houses on the National Register of Historic Places in Virginia
Queen Anne architecture in Virginia
Houses completed in 1893
Houses in Montgomery County, Virginia
National Register of Historic Places in Montgomery County, Virginia